Terje Østebø Eikin (born 17 November 1975) is a Norwegian politician for the Christian Democratic Party.

He served as a deputy representative to the Parliament of Norway from Aust-Agder during the term 2013–2017. He hails from Arendal.

References

1975 births
Living people
People from Arendal
Deputy members of the Storting
Christian Democratic Party (Norway) politicians
Aust-Agder politicians